Kurino may refer to:

Kurino, Kagoshima, a former town in Aira District, Kagoshima Prefecture, Japan
Kurino Station, a railway station in Aira District, Kagoshima Prefecture, Japan

People with the surname
, Japanese diplomat

Japanese-language surnames